Louis Alexandre may refer to:

 Louis Alexandre, Prince of Lamballe (1747–1768)
 Louis Alexandre, Count of Toulouse (1678–1737)